The State Commission of the Lithuanian Language (VLKK) is the official language regulating body of the Lithuanian language.

The Language Commission was put in operation in 1961 as a non-governmental entity under the auspices of the Lithuanian Academy of Sciences.

Now, it is a state-run language police, founded under the auspices of the Seimas (parliament) of Lithuania. The mandate of the Commission comprises not only regulation and standardization of the language, but also implementation of the official language status. Commission decrees on linguistic issues are compulsory by law to all companies, agencies, institutions, and the media in Lithuania.

References

External links
 
 Amendment of the Republic of Lithuania law on the status of the state commission of the Lithuanian language

Language regulators
Lithuanian language